"Joy to the World" is a Christmas carol written by Isaac Watts/George Frideric Handel.

Joy to the World may also refer to:

Music
Joy to the World (Mormon Tabernacle Choir album)
Joy to the World (Connie Smith album)
Joy to the World (Faith Hill album)
Joy to the World (Pink Martini album)
Joy To The World: A Bluegrass Christmas, a 2009 album by Charlie Daniels
Joy To The World, a 1971 album by Hoyt Axton
"Joy to the World" (Three Dog Night song)
"Joy to the World" (Phelps), an adaptation of Watts' lyrics by early Latter Day Saint leader William W. Phelps
"Joy to the World", a song by Combichrist from the album The Joy of Gunz
Joy to the World (Lincoln Brewster album)
Joy to the World: Their Greatest Hits, a Three Dog Night album

Other
"Joy to the World" (House), an episode of the television series House

See also
A Very Special Christmas: 25 Years Bringing Joy to the World